Olaf Wijnants (born 14 September 1948 in The Hague) is a Dutch actor, who has been active in Film and Television since 1971.

Wijnants is best known in The Netherlands for appearing in several successful Dutch Television programmes such as Swiebertje, Goede tijden, slechte tijden, Toen Was Geluk Heel Gewoon and Kinderen geen bezwaar. Although he is probably best remembered for his voice over work, having dubbed the characters Asterix, Big Bird (in Sesame Street) and The Mayor (in The Powerpuff Girls) for the Dutch audience. Wijnants has also dubbed Asterix for the UK audience in the 1999 film Asterix & Obelix Take on Caesar.

Wijnants also works as a voice over artist on television and radio stations and is the voice of the Royal Dutch Touring Club and KPN.

External links
 
 Anime News Network profile

1948 births
Living people
Dutch male television actors
Dutch male film actors
Dutch male voice actors
Radio and television announcers
Male actors from The Hague
20th-century Dutch people